Nikolaos Fexis (born 1906, date of death unknown) was a Greek boxer. He competed in the men's flyweight event at the 1928 Summer Olympics.

References

External links
 

1906 births
Year of death missing
Greek male boxers
Olympic boxers of Greece
Boxers at the 1928 Summer Olympics
People from Lefkada
Flyweight boxers
Sportspeople from the Ionian Islands (region)
20th-century Greek people